Third World Resurgence is the flagship magazine of Third World Network,  an international network of organizations and individuals involved in issues relating to environment, development and the Third World and North-South issues. The magazine was started in 1990. According to their website, the aim of the magazine is to give a Third World perspective to the whole range of issues confronting the Third World namely, the environment, health and basic needs, international affairs, politics, economics, culture, and so on. The magazine is published on a monthly basis and is headquartered in Penang, Malaysia. It has also a Spanish version.

References

External links
 Website of Third World Resurgence
 WorldCat record

1990 establishments in Malaysia
English-language magazines
Magazines established in 1990
Magazines published in Malaysia
Monthly magazines
Political magazines
Spanish-language magazines
Political magazines published in Malaysia